Copenhagen is an independent Canadian-American coming-of-age adventure film. It had its world premiere as the opening narrative feature at the 20th anniversary edition of the Slamdance Film Festival 2014. The film won the Grand Jury Prize at the Florida Film Festival and Gasparilla Film Festival.

Synopsis
After weeks of travelling through Europe, the immature American, William, finds himself at crossroads in Copenhagen. Copenhagen is not just another European city for William; it is also the city of his father's birth. When Effy, working in William's hotel, befriends the twenty-eight year-old William they set off on an adventure to deliver a letter written by William's father, to his father, after he was abandoned when eight years old. Along the way, thanks to Effy's persistence, they uncover William's family's sordid past.

An attraction builds between William and Effy. They explore a museum where William caresses Effy's face and nearly kisses her before they are interrupted. Effy has been evasive about her age, but when pressed makes the startling revelation that she is not a hotel employee, but is a 14-year-old doing her grammar school praktik (internship) at the hotel.

One night at a bar William sees Effy being dragged out of the bar by an older man, who is revealed to be Effy's mother's boyfriend. William manages to stop the man from dragging Effy away and beats him up, causing both him and Effy to flee the scene.

William sneaks Effy inside his hotel room. After talking with him for a short while, Effy tells William that she loves him and asks him if he wants her. He replies yes, but expresses hesitancy because of her age. They start undressing and kiss, before William stops, covers the topless Effy with a sheet, and holds her close. In the next scene it is morning, and Effy awakes fully clothed. William is sitting atop the bedclothes; she is under them.

Effy translates Daniel's letter to his father for William. He thanks her, and they go their separate ways. Effy returns to her mother's apartment, where her mom's boyfriend tries to make up with her. Effy evades his touch and says she is going to tell her mother. William soon arrives at the home of his grandfather and delivers his father's letter to the grandfather he had never known.

Back at school, Effy quietly looks at several pictures she had taken with William and smiles at one of her sleeping in the hotel room she had shared with William. At the same time, William stands at the symbolic Skagen, where the North Sea meets the Baltic.

Cast
Gethin Anthony – William
Frederikke Dahl Hansen – Effy
Sebastian Armesto – Jeremy
Olivia Grant – Jennifer
Baard Owe – Uncle Mads
Mille Dinesen – Effy's mother
 – Henrik
Tamzin Merchant – Sandra
 – Thomas Vinter
Sebastian Bull Sarning - Albert
 – Uncle Peter
Sune Kofoed – receptionist Madsen
Silja Eriksen Jensen – Signe
 – Berlin girl
Asbjørn Krogh Nissen – Ivan
Zaki Nobel Mehabil – bartender Markus
 - Thomas Buttenschøn
Miriam Yeager - school teacher
Sune Kaarsberg - office secretary (voice)
Kåre Fjalland - priest
Jane Pejtersen - Dane on bridge	 
Hélène Kuhn - Heather
Mads Korsgaard - hostel bartender
Lars-Bo Johansen - karaoke singer

Production
The film was produced by Fidelio Films and Scorched Films. The film was shot in Copenhagen. It is the first feature film by Student Academy Award winner Mark Raso. The film was produced by Mauro Mueller and Mette Thygesen.

Release
The film premièred in theaters on October 3, 2014 in the US and on December 5 in Canada.

Reception
The film received positive reviews upon release. As of March 2021, 88% of the 16 reviews compiled by Rotten Tomatoes are positive, and have an average score of 7.1 out of 10.

New York Times film critic David DeWitt writes that Raso's "absorbing film has a delicate nuance that will linger after the popcorn's gone". Joe Leydon for Variety (magazine) writes that "To his credit, writer-director Raso provides an answer that is both emotionally and dramatically satisfying. Better still, he gets a pitch-perfect performance from Danish up-and-comer Hansen, who greatly impresses with her unaffected spontaneity, playing Effy as both precociously wise and tremulously vulnerable". The Hollywood Reporter called the film "an impressive feature debut".

Awards

References

http://filmmakermagazine.com/48072-marc-rasos-microbudget-production-diary-part-1/
http://filmmakermagazine.com/50735-mark-rasos-microbudget-production-diary-wrap-reflections/

External links

2014 films
American independent films
American coming-of-age films
Films set in Copenhagen
Films shot in Copenhagen
2010s adventure films
2010s English-language films
Films directed by Mark Raso
2010s American films